Sveti Kuzam is a village located between Bakar and Rijeka in Primorje-Gorski Kotar County, Croatia. The village is administered as a part of the City of Rijeka.

The village was recorded on the 2011 Croatian census as a settlement named "Bakar" with a population of 240. The 2006 law on administrative divisions mentions no other settlement within the City of Rijeka. On 27 February 2014, Rijeka city council passed a decision to annex the settlement (named "Bakar-dio (Sv. Kuzam")) to the settlement of Rijeka.

References

Populated places in Primorje-Gorski Kotar County